Rosbach vor der Höhe station is a railway station in the municipality of Rosbach vor der Höhe, located in the Wetteraukreis district in Hesse, Germany. It has two side platforms.

References

Railway stations in Hesse
Buildings and structures in Wetteraukreis
Railway stations in Germany opened in 1901